Darren McCurry is an Irish Gaelic Footballer and plays for Edendork and Tyrone.

References

Irish Gaelic footballers
Edendork St Malachy's Gaelic footballers
Year of birth missing (living people)
Living people